The Sun Odyssey 419 is a French sailboat that was designed by Philippe Briand and the Jeanneau Design Office as a cruiser and first built in 2015.

The boat is a development of the Sun Odyssey 409, which it replaced in production. Compared to the 409, the 419 has a wider swimming platform and a bowsprit.

Production
The design was built by Jeanneau in France, from 2015 to 2019, with about 300 completed, but it is now out of production.

Design
The Sun Odyssey 419 is a recreational keelboat, built predominantly of polyester fiberglass, with wood trim. It has a fractional sloop rig with a bowsprit, with a deck-stepped mast, two sets of swept spreaders and aluminum spars with 1X19 stainless steel wire rigging. The hard-chined hull has a raked stem, a reverse transom with a drop-down tailgate swimming platform, an internally mounted spade-type rudder controlled by dual wheels and a fixed "L"-shaped fin keel with a weighted bulb or optional shoal-draft keel. The fin keel model displaces  empty and carries  of cast iron ballast, while the shoal draft version displaces  and carries  of cast iron ballast.

The design was built with two and three cabin interiors, with sleeping accommodation for four to six people. The two cabin arrangement has a double "V"-berth in the bow cabin, a "U"-shaped settee and a straight settee in the main cabin and an aft cabin with a double berth on the starboard side. The three cabin version adds a second aft cabin on the port side. The galley is located on the starboard side just forward of the companionway ladder. The galley is "L"-shaped and is equipped with a two-burner stove, an ice box and a double sink. The head is located just aft of the polyester on the port side and includes a shower. A second head mahy be installed on the starboard side inside the bow cabin.

Operational history
In a 2016 review for boats.com, Diego Yriarte wrote, "it is true that the hull lines, particularly the hard chine, make you think this is a racing boat, even more so when considering the addition of the bowsprit, but the true calling of the Sun Odyssey 419 is comfortable, fast cruising. Nevertheless, there’s no reason you couldn’t enter your 419 in a local regatta and enjoy a lap around the racecourse."

See also
List of sailing boat types

References

External links

Keelboats
2010s sailboat type designs
Sailing yachts
Sailboat type designs by Philippe Briand
Sailboat type designs by Jeanneau Design Office
Sailboat types built by Jeanneau